El País is a national daily newspaper in Spain.

El País (Spanish for "The Country") may also refer to:

 El País (Cali), a newspaper in Colombia
 El País (Tarija), a newspaper in Bolivia
 El País (Uruguay), a newspaper in Uruguay

See also
 País, a leftist political party in Chile